Westgate Park was a baseball stadium located in San Diego, California. The ballpark was home to the San Diego Padres of the Pacific Coast League from 1958 to 1967.

The ballpark was located in the largely undeveloped Mission Valley region of San Diego. The location was on Friars Road at State Route 395 (now State Route 163), in the northeast corner of what is now the Fashion Valley Mall.

Westgate was built to replace the deteriorating Lane Field, where the minor-league Padres had played since 1936. Constructed for $1 million in private funds by Padres owner C. Arnholt Smith, Westgate was a modern stadium with a capacity of 8,268 fans, with an eye to be expanded to major league size (up to 40,000) if necessary. In 1958 when it opened, "Not even Yankee Stadium or Boston's Fenway Park can surpass the comforts and conveniences of the Padres' new home. ... This is a real ballpark, built for the game of baseball, a ballpark in which the city of San Diego can take great pride." It was named for the Westgate-California Tuna Packing Corporation.

The first Padres games played in Westgate were on April 28, 1958, a day-night doubleheader versus the Phoenix Giants. Actor William Powell threw out the first pitch. San Diego won the first game, 5-3, and the second, 3-1. The afternoon game attracted 4,619 fans, while the nightcap attracted 7,129 fans.

However, the American Football League's San Diego Chargers were demanding a new stadium to replace Balboa Stadium, a structure dating from about 1915. With major league baseball soon to arrive, the city decided to build a single, multi-purpose stadium for both baseball and football. The new facility was initially called San Diego Stadium. 
This ended the possibility of expansion for Westgate. The minor league Padres played the 1968 season in the cavernous (by PCL standards) new stadium, knowing they were a lame duck, with the major league San Diego Padres set to begin play the next year. Plans for Fashion Valley Mall were unveiled in December 1967, and Westgate was razed by 1969 to make room.

References

External links
 Aerial photo of Westgate Park

American football venues in California
Baseball venues in California
Defunct baseball venues in the United States
Defunct college football venues
San Diego Toreros football
Sports venues in San Diego
Sports venues completed in 1958
1958 establishments in California
1967 disestablishments in California